V. K. Ahuja is a senior professor at the Faculty of Law, University of Delhi, India and is presently serving as the Vice-Chancellor of National Law University and Judicial Academy, Assam (NLUJAA), India. He has been a legal academic in the field of Intellectual Property Rights and International Law.

Education 
Prof. Ahuja obtained his Master's degree in Law from Faculty of Law, University of Delhi, Master of Philosophy (M. Phil) from Jawaharlal Nehru University, Delhi and Ph.D. from the University of Delhi.

Academic career
Prof. Ahuja started his career in 1994 as a research associate at Faculty of Law, University of Delhi and became a Lecturer in 1995. In the year 2004, he was elevated to the post of Reader. Later he became associate professor in the year 2007 and professor in 2010 at University of Delhi. He also served as the Principal of Lovely Institute of Law, Punjab (affiliated to Guru Nanak Dev University, Amritsar). He was the Professor In-charge of Law Centre-II, Faculty of Law, University of Delhi  during 2017-2020. Furthermore, he was also appointed as Joint Director of Delhi School of Public Policy and Governance established under the Institute of Eminence (IOE), University of Delhi in 2020. In June 2021, Ahuja was appointed as Vice-Chancellor of National Law University and Judicial Academy, Assam, India.

Memberships and Boards
Prof. Ahuja served as a member of the Governing Body of Hindu College and Aryabhatta College of University of Delhi. He is also associated as a member of the Board of Management of Judicial Academy, Assam and a Member of the General Council of Damodaram Sanjivayya National Law University, Visakhapatnam. He served as a member of the Board of Studies/Academic Council/Executive Council of several Central and State Universities such as Rajiv Gandhi University, Arunachal Pradesh, Sikkim University, Rajiv Gandhi National University of Law, Patiala, Dr. B.R. Ambedkar National Law University, Sonipat, School of Law, VIT-AP University, B.B. Ambedkar University, Lucknow to name a few. He was the Regional Co-Ordinator for the entire North-East for the Common Law Admission Test (CLAT) in the year 2021 and a member of the Governing Body of the Consortium of NLUs. Prof. Ahuja is one of the Jury members of India Small and Medium Enterprises (SME) 100 Awards 2022.

Awards 
In 2003, he received the first prize as an exemplary teacher in the Fifth South Asian Teaching Session on International Humanitarian Law and Refugee Law organized jointly by the International Committee of the Red Cross (ICRC), United Nations High Commissioner for Refugees (UNHCR) and National Law School of India University, Bangalore.

Selected publications

Books 
 Law Relating to Intellectual Property Rights (1st edition 2007, 2nd edition 2013 and 3rd edition 2017)
 Law of Copyright and Neighboring Rights: National and International Perspectives (1st edition 2005, 2nd edition 2015)
 Public International Law (1st edition 2016, 2nd edition, 2021)
 Intellectual Property Rights in India (1st edition 2009, 2nd edition 2015)
Halsbury Annotated Statutes of India (Vol.2 and Vol.5)

Books edited/co-authored 
 Human Rights: Contemporary Issues - A Festschrift in the Honour of Professor Upendra Baxi (2019)
 Legal Education in India in 21st Century: Problems and Prospects (1999)
 Law of Copyright: From Gutenberg's Invention to Internet (2001)
 The Law of Intellectual Property Rights: In Prospect and Retrospect (2001)
 Human Rights in 21st Century: Changing Dimensions (2012)
 Mediation (2020)
 Intellectual Property Rights: Contemporary Developments (2020)
 International Law: Contemporary Developments (2021)
 Mukul Asher on Economic Reasoning and Public Policy: Case Studies from India (2021)

References 

Heads of universities and colleges in India
Academicians
Indian legal scholars
1967 births
Living people